I Am an American Soldier is a 2007 documentary film about the Iraq War, produced by John Laurence.
"One Year in Iraq with the 101st Airborne."

Synopsis

This is the inside story of what happens to a company of American soldiers - ninety-two air assault troopers from the 3rd Brigade, 101st Airborne Division (Rakkasans) - who are sent to fight, suffer and try to survive a full year's tour of duty in Iraq. From the final stages of their training and farewells at Fort Campbell, Kentucky, through their deployment to Baghdad, Samarra and Tikrit, and then the return home to their loved ones, this is a searching examination of the combat, the life and death struggles, and the profound changes in the lives of these professional soldiers who set out with hope and confidence of making a difference in Iraq.

Access
The British/American filmmakers were given unprecedented access to the soldiers for fourteen months: from September 2005, to November 2006, and accompanied them into the most dangerous places. The result is a feature film that attempts to examine the Iraq War with ruthless scrutiny, with honesty and fairness, and reveals courage of an uncommon kind.

Before they leave Fort Campbell, hundreds of soldiers shout “Hoo-ah” in response to their brigade commander's dramatic war speech in which he tells them to "look like a killer" at all times in Iraq. The film begins by demonstrating the lethal force of America's best-trained soldiers. But that is not how the rest of the story unfolds.

The soldiers of Charlie Troop find it increasingly difficult to carry out their mission in a hostile environment, full of deception and danger. A carefully planned attempt to destroy a team of insurgents who are firing rockets and mortars at them, the troops are sabotaged by the over-protective actions of a parent unit from the Third Infantry Division. Despite vigilant surveillance work, superior weapons and training, and all the energy of their warrior natures, the soldiers are thrown into the most frustrating mission conceivable.

This is a film about young men and their commanders who prepare in earnest for their duty, who understand what they are meant to do in Iraq, and how - through their experiences in Samarra, Baghdad and Tikrit - dramatic changes take place in their perspectives.

It is about soldiers who fight for their lives when their humvee is destroyed by insurgents. It is about a specialist who shoots up a car full of people who later turn out to be civilians. It is about mothers and young wives, gathered at a military funeral for the soldiers killed in action in Iraq, mourning their lost sons and husbands.

This is their story, narrated by the soldiers and their families. It provides the most revealing, in-depth look inside the U.S. Army at war ever produced on film.

Between them, Laurence, Green and Thompson have covered more than thirty wars since Vietnam in 1965, and have won every major award in broadcast journalism in the United States.

References

External links
I Am an American Soldier website
 

2007 films
Documentary films about the Iraq War
2000s English-language films